This is a list of pizza chains of the United States. This list is limited to pizza chain restaurants that are based, headquartered or originated in the United States.

Pizza chains of the United States

&pizza
America's Incredible Pizza Company
Arni's Restaurant
Aurelio's Pizza
Azzip Pizza
Bearno's
Bertucci's
Big Mama's & Papa's Pizzeria
Big Mario's Pizza
Blackjack Pizza
Blaze Pizza
Buddy's Pizza
Casey's General Stores
California Pizza Kitchen
Cassano's Pizza King
Chuck E. Cheese
Cicis
Cottage Inn Pizza
Dion's
Domino's Pizza
Donatos Pizza
DoubleDave's Pizzaworks
East of Chicago Pizza
Extreme Pizza
Fellini's Pizza
Figaro's Pizza
Fox's Pizza Den
Frank Pepe Pizzeria Napoletana
Gino's East
Gino's Pizza and Spaghetti
Giordano's Pizzeria
Glass Nickel Pizza Company
Godfather's Pizza
Grimaldi's Pizzeria
Grotto Pizza
Happy Joe's
Happy's Pizza
Hideaway Pizza
Home Run Inn
Hungry Howie's Pizza
Hunt Brothers Pizza
Ian's Pizza
Imo's Pizza
Jerry's Subs & Pizza
Jet's Pizza
John's Incredible Pizza Company
LaRosa's Pizzeria
Ledo Pizza
Little Caesars
Lou Malnati's Pizzeria
Marco's Pizza
Marion's Piazza
Mazzio's
Mellow Mushroom
MOD Pizza
Monical's Pizza
Mountain Mike's Pizza
Mr. Gatti's Pizza
Noble Roman's
Old Chicago
Pagliacci Pizza
Papa Gino's
Papa John's Pizza
Papa Murphy's
Pat's Pizza
Patxi's Chicago Pizza
Peter Piper Pizza
Pie Five
Pieology
Pietro's Pizza
Pizza Factory
Pizza Fusion
Pizza Hut
Pizza Inn
Pizza My Heart
Pizza Patrón
Pizza Ranch
Pizza Schmizza
Pizza Studio
Regina Pizzeria
Rocky Rococo
Rosati's Authentic Chicago Pizza
Rotolo’s Pizzeria
Round Table Pizza 
Russo's New York Pizzeria
Sal's Pizza
Sammy's Pizza
Sarpino's Pizzeria
Sbarro
Shakey's Pizza
Sir Pizza
Sizzle Pie
Snappy Tomato Pizza
Straw Hat Pizza
Toppers Pizza
Two Boots
Uncle Maddio's Pizza Joint
Uno Pizzeria & Grill
Upper Crust Pizzeria
Valentino's
Via Tribunali
Vocelli Pizza
Your Pie
zpizza

Former pizza chains
 Discovery Zone
 Eatza Pizza
 Pizza Corner
 ShowBiz Pizza Place
 Pizza Haven
 The Brothers Three

See also

 List of pizza chains
 List of pizza franchises
 List of restaurant chains
 List of restaurant chains in the United States
 Lists of restaurants

External links
 
 

Lists of restaurants

American cuisine-related lists